Lamine Ouahab (Arabic: الأمين وهاب al-ʼAmīn Wahhāb) (born 22 December 1984) is a Moroccan professional tennis player.

Career

Juniors
As a junior, Ouahab reached as high as No. 4 in singles in January 2002 (and No. 18 in doubles), compiling a singles win–loss record of 92–24. He reached the boys' singles final of Wimbledon in 2002, defeating Rafael Nadal en route before losing to Todd Reid.

Pro tour
Ouahab turned professional in 2002 at the age of 17.

Due to his junior success, he got a wild card into the 2004 Summer Olympics main draw. He lost in the first round to 15th seed Tommy Robredo.

Ouahab made his ATP debut in 2006 at the Grand Prix Hassan II in his home country of Morocco after receiving a wildcard into the main draw. He lost in the first round to Florian Mayer.

In 2009, Ouahab qualified for his first and only grand slam tournament at the Australian Open. He lost in the first round to Florian Mayer. It was also in 2009 that he reach his career-high ranking of 114 on September 21 which is also the highest ranked any Algerian player has been in history.

In late 2013, Ouahab acquired a Moroccan passport and officially stopped representing Algeria and started representing Morocco.

At the 2015 Grand Prix Hassan II, Ouahab made his only ATP quarterfinal after defeating 1st seed and world number 24 Guillermo García López in the second round. He lost to Daniel Gimeno Traver.

At the 2018 Grand Prix Hassan II, 617 ranked Ouahab upset the 3rd seed and world number 34 Philipp Kohlschreiber in the first round. He lost in the second round to Nikoloz Basilashvili.

Davis Cup
As a member of the Algerian Davis Cup team, Ouahab posted a 17–3 record in singles and an 8–1 record in doubles. As a member of the Moroccan Davis Cup team, he posted a 
7–5 record in singles and a 3–4 record in doubles. These records add up to overall records of 24–8 in singles, 11–5 in doubles, and 35–13 overall.

Junior Grand Slam finals

Singles: 1 (1 runner-up)

Performance timeline

Singles

ATP Challenger and ITF Futures finals

Singles: 58 (36–22)

Doubles: 32 (19–13)

External links
 
 
 

1984 births
Living people
Algerian expatriate sportspeople in Spain
Algerian male tennis players
Moroccan male tennis players
Algerian emigrants to Morocco
Olympic tennis players of Algeria
Tennis players from Barcelona
Sportspeople from Algiers
Tennis players at the 2004 Summer Olympics
Naturalized citizens of Morocco
Mediterranean Games silver medalists for Algeria
Competitors at the 2005 Mediterranean Games
African Games gold medalists for Algeria
African Games medalists in tennis
Mediterranean Games medalists in tennis
Competitors at the 2007 All-Africa Games
Competitors at the 2019 African Games